Claire Lefilliâtre is a contemporary French soprano specialising in Baroque music repertoire.

Lefilliâtre collaborates mainly with the ensemble Le Poème Harmonique of Vincent Dumestre.

Discography (selection)

Recordings with Le Poème Harmonique 
 1999 L'Humaine Comédie by Etienne Moulinié with Sophie Watillon and Friederike Heumann (Alpha)
 2001 Aux Marches du Palais (Alpha)
 2001 Lamentations by Emilio de Cavalieri (Alpha)
 2002 Le Consert des Consorts by Pierre Guédron with Sophie Watillon and Friederike Heumann (Alpha)
 2002 Il Fasolo ? (Alpha)
 2002 Tenebrae by Michel-Richard de Lalande (Alpha)
 2003 Nova Metamorfosi (Alpha)
 2003 Je meurs sans mourir by Antoine Boesset (Alpha)
 2004 Plaisir d'amour with Bruce Duisit and Isabelle Druet
 2005 Le Bourgeois gentilhomme at the Royal Opera of Versailles with Benjamin Lazar (DVD) (Alpha), le grand prix du disque and DVD of the Académie Charles-Cros, baroque music category
 2007 Carnets de voyages by Charles Tessier (Alpha)
 2008 Cadmus & Hermione by Jean-Baptiste Lully and Philippe Quinault (DVD) (Alpha)
 2010 Combattimenti Monteverdi-Marazzoli  (including the Lamento della Ninfa) (Alpha)

Other recordings 
 Motets à une et deux voix by André Campra with Raphaële Kennedy and the ensemble Da Pacem (Arion)
 Madrigali e Altre Musiche Concertate by Tarquinio Merula with the ensemble Suonare e Cantare (Pierre Verany)
 Muse honorons l'illustre & grand Henry by Claude Lejeune with Les Pages & les Chantres of the Centre de Musique Baroque de Versailles, dir. Olivier Schneebeli (Alpha)
 Histoire de la nativité by Heinrich Schütz with Hans-Jörg Mammel and the Chœur de chambre de Namur and the ensemble La Fenice, dir. Jean Tubéry (K617)
 Te Deum H.146 by Marc-Antoine Charpentier with the Chœur de chambre de Namur and the ensemble La Fenice, conducted by. Jean Tubéry (Ricercar) 2004.
 Italian Music in the Low Countries with the ensemble Currende, conducted by Erik Van Nevel. Klara, 2010.
 Christ lag in Todesbanden by Johann Pachelbel with the Chœur de chambre de Namur and the ensemble Les Agrémens, dir. Jean Tubéry (Ricercar)

Filmography  
 Lefilliâtre lent her voice to Natacha Régnier for the interpretation of Monteverdi's Lamento della ninfa in the film  directed by Eugène Green in 2004. All the music in this film is interpreted by Le Poème Harmonique conducted by Vincent Dumestre.
 2016: Le Fils de Joseph, by Eugène Green

References

External links 
 Biography of Claire Lefilliâtre
 Claire Lefilliâtre on France Musique
 Claire Lefilliâtre on 1001 notes
 Claire Lefilliâtre on AllMusic

French operatic sopranos
Year of birth missing (living people)
Living people
20th-century French women opera  singers
21st-century French women opera  singers

es:Claire Lefilliâtre#top